Takeshi Katō may refer to:
Takeshi Kato, father of Japanese-Indonesian actress Yuki Kato
Takeshi Katō (actor) (加藤武), Japanese actor
Takeshi Katō (gymnast) (加藤武司), Japanese gymnast